The XV Grand Prix de l'Albigeois was a combined Formula One and Formula Two motor race held on 31 May 1953 at Circuit Les Planques, Albi, France. The race was held over two heats of 10 laps; one for Formula One and one for Formula Two, and a final of 18 laps in which both classes took part. The top four finishers in each heat qualified for the final, plus another four based on finishing position. 

Élie Bayol in an O.S.C.A. Tipo 20 qualified in pole position for the Formula Two heat but finished second behind Louis Rosier's Ferrari 500. Peter Whitehead was third in a Cooper T24-Alta. Roberto Mieres set fastest lap in his Gordini Type 16.

In the Formula One heat, Juan Manuel Fangio qualified on pole, set fastest lap and won in a BRM Type 15. José Froilán González was second in another Type 15 and Louis Rosier was third in a Ferrari 375.

Rosier won the final in the Ferrari 375. González was second and Maurice Trintignant third in a Gordini Type 16. Ken Wharton set fastest lap in another BRM Type 16.

Classification

Heat One - Formula Two cars

Heat Two - Formula One cars

Final 

Formula One competitors highlighted in blue.

1Lyons should have been in the final but had packed his car away, believing he had been eliminated. Giraud-Cabantous took his place.

References

Albi Grand Prix
Albi Grand Prix
Albi Grand Prix
Albi Grand Prix